Lawrence Russell Dewey (May 19, 1901 – December 18, 1994) was a major general in the United States Army.

Biography

Dewey was born in Des Moines, Iowa on May 19, 1901. He married Florence Powers and they had four children: Lawrence Russell Dewey, Jr.; Florence "Cici" Powers Dewey (Mrs. Francis J. Hughes); Donald Herbert Dewey; Elizabeth Hazard Dewey (Mrs. Christopher L. Vance). Lawrence, Jr. also became an officer in the military.

Dewey graduated from the United States Military Academy in 1924. From 1933 to 1939, he served as aide-de-camp to Brigadier General Evan Harris Humphrey. In 1939, he was assigned as a troop commander in the 3rd Cavalry Regiment.

During World War II, he served in various positions with the 1st Armored Division, including Chief of Staff. Following the war, he was named Assistant Divisional Commander until 1951. From there, he became Chief of Staff of the IX Corps during the Korean War. He served in various posts until his retirement in 1961. Awards he received during his career include the Silver Star, the Legion of Merit, the Bronze Star Medal, and the Purple Heart.

After his retirement from the Army, he became a member of the National Board of Estimates of the Central Intelligence Agency.

He died at his home in Washington, D.C. on December 18, 1994, after suffering from Parkinson's disease. He is buried with Florence at Arlington National Cemetery.

References

United States Army generals
Recipients of the Silver Star
Recipients of the Legion of Merit
United States Army personnel of World War II
United States Army personnel of the Korean War
United States Military Academy alumni
People from Des Moines, Iowa
Burials at Arlington National Cemetery
1901 births
1994 deaths
Military personnel from Iowa